Thousand Springs State Park is a public recreation and nature preservation area consisting of multiple units — Billingsley Creek, Earl M. Hardy Box Canyon Springs Nature Preserve, Malad Gorge, Niagara Springs, and Ritter Island — in Gooding County, Idaho.

Park units
The state park was created in 2005, when four existing state parks in the Hagerman Valley were merged into a single entity, with an additional unit subsequently added to the complex.

Billingsley Creek
This former ranch was purchased by the state in 2001.  One feature is the homesite of western author Vardis Fisher.  Billingsley Creek Unit totals .

Earl M. Hardy Box Canyon Springs Nature Preserve
This  box canyon has  walls. There is a  waterfall. The  property was developed by the Nature Conservancy which purchased the site in 1999, then completed its transfer to the state in 2016. (Does this include Priestly's Hydraulic Ram, listed on the National Register of Historic Places?)

Malad Gorge
Malad Gorge is a  canyon formed by the Malad River, downstream from a  waterfall. This  day-use unit is off Interstate 84 and offers hiking and picnicking. A section of the Oregon Trail is visible. Rock pigeons, red-tailed hawks and golden eagles nest in the canyon. Yellow-bellied marmots are found on the canyon floor.

Niagara Springs

Ritter Island
This unit lies along the Snake River between two large springs.

See also

 List of Idaho state parks
 National Parks in Idaho

References

Further reading

External links

Thousand Springs State Park Idaho Parks and Recreation
Thousand Springs State Park Brochure Idaho Parks and Recreation

Protected areas of Gooding County, Idaho
State parks of Idaho
Protected areas established in 2005
Snake River
2005 establishments in Idaho
National Natural Landmarks in Idaho